The Tennessee Volunteers women's Swimming and Diving program represents the University of Tennessee located in Knoxville, Tennessee. The Volunteers are currently coached by Matt Kredich. The Lady Vols host their swim home meets in 
Allan Jones Intercollegiate Aquatic Center which was newly built in 2008. The Lady compete in the SEC where they have won 2 SEC team titles (2020 and 2022), 84 individual, relay, and diving titles. Additionally, the program is one of only 3 that have scored in all 40 NCAA meets, and it has produced 8 NCAA individual and relay titles, 16 Olympians, and 3 Olympic medalists.

Along with all other UT women's sports teams, it used the nickname "Lady Volunteers" (or the short form "Lady Vols") until the 2015–16 school year, when the school dropped the "Lady" prefix from the nicknames of all women's teams except in basketball. In 2017 the university announced the return of the “Lady Volunteer” name.

History
While the men's program has more historical success than the women's side, the Lady Vols lead the SEC in NCAA Championship appearances and are one of only three programs nationally (Stanford & Arizona) to score and appear in all 40 NCAA Championships since the event's inception in 1982. All time, the Lady Vols have finished in the Top 10 at the NCAAs 11 times, including a current steak of 4 straight, and in the top 5 twice.

Dan Colella Era 
Lady Vols were led by Pete Raykovich from 1990-1993. His three teams finished 17th, 18th, and 19th respectively at the NCAAs. Dan Colella, an assistant on the team, succeeded Raykovich for the next 12 seasons before he left following the 2006 season to take the head coaching job for both of Duke's swimming teams. At UT, ten of Colella's twelve teams finished in the top 25 of the NCAA Championships; however, they finished in the top 10 just once.

Matt Kredich Era 
Under current head coach Matt Kredich, the Lady Vols have become a national power. Some notable accomplishments include 9 top 10 finishes at the NCAAs, a program-high 3rd place mark at the 2013 NCAA Championships, and winning their first and only SEC titles in 2020 and 2022. When the 2020 NCAA Championships were cancelled, the Lady Vols were ranked #2 in the nation. Under Kredich's direction the Lady Vols have broken 18-of-19 Tennessee swimming records, had 19 different athletes garner 120 All-America awards and finished in the top-15 at the NCAA Championships for a UT-record eleven consecutive seasons.

Head coaches
Source

Yearly Record
Source

Note: The 2020 season was canceled after the SEC Championships due to the Coronavirus Pandemic, the NCAA Championships were not held.

NCAA Individual & Relay champions
The Lady Vols have won 8 NCAA Individual & Relay titles all time, including 3 relay titles in 2013.

Conference Individual Event Champions

The Lady Vols have won 91 total SEC individual, relay, and diving titles throughout their history.

Tennessee Lady Volunteers Olympians
The Lady Vol swimming program has had 16 Olympians compete since the 1980s, winning 5 medals total. The following list include all of the former and current Olympic participants.

Medalists

Participants

See also 
Tennessee Volunteers men's swimming and diving

Swimming at the Summer Olympics

References

External links
 

Tennessee Volunteers swimming and diving
1971 establishments in Tennessee